David Newton Thompson (January 7, 1859 – November 28, 1945) was a justice of the Louisiana Supreme Court from December 5, 1922, to December 1, 1930.

Born in Harrisonburg, Catahoula Parish, Louisiana, Thompson was a Deputy Clerk of Court and Recorder of Deeds and Mortgages before serving as District Attorney for the Eighth Judicial District of Louisiana from 1892 to 1900. He was then a judge of that district until 1908, and judge of the state's Court of Appeal for the Second Circuit from 1908 to 1922. He served on the Louisiana Supreme Court for eight years, from 1922 to 1930.

Thompson died in his home, in Monroe, Louisiana, at the age of 86, following a long illness.

References

1859 births
1945 deaths
People from Catahoula Parish, Louisiana
Justices of the Louisiana Supreme Court